Barra do Chapéu is a municipality in the state of São Paulo in Brazil. The population is 5,760 (2020 est.) in an area of 406 km². The elevation is 784 m.

References

Municipalities in São Paulo (state)